The California Golden Seals were a professional ice hockey franchise based in Oakland, California from 1967–76. They played their first seven seasons in the West Division and their final two seasons in the Adams Division. During their time in Oakland the Golden Seals drafted 72 players and participated in ten National Hockey League Amateur Drafts before the franchise relocated to Cleveland, Ohio on July 14, 1976.

This list features every player drafted by the Golden Seals and his regular season stats for his career.

The Golden Seals' first draft pick was Ken Hicks who was selected third overall in the 1967 NHL Amateur Draft. The highest that California ever drafted was third overall, which they did three times, selecting Ken Hicks (1967), Rick Hampton (1974) and Ralph Klassen (1975). No Golden Seals' draft pick ever played in over 1,000 NHL games, the closest any player selected by the team came to this mark was Ron Stackhouse who played in 889 regular season games. To date no Golden Seals' draft pick has ever been selected to the Hockey Hall of Fame.

Key
 Played at least one game with the Seals
 Spent entire NHL career with the Seals

Draft picks

See also
List of California Golden Seals players
List of Cleveland Barons draft picks
1967 NHL Expansion Draft

References

 
 
 

 
draft picks
Golden Seals